The 1999 season of the Ukrainian Championship was the 8th season of Ukraine's women's football competitions. The championship ran from 14 May 1999 to 14 September 1999.

This was the last season WFC Donchanka ever won national title.

Teams

Team changes

Name changes
 Kyivska Rus was debuting, but the last Kyiv team Alina last competed in 1997

Higher League

League table

References

External links
WFPL.ua
Women's Football.ua

1997
1999–2000 in Ukrainian association football leagues
1998–99 in Ukrainian association football leagues
Ukrainian Women's League
Ukrainian Women's League